Roger Edward Alfred Farmer is a British/American economist. He is currently a professor at the University of Warwick and is a Distinguished Emeritus Professor and former Chair of the Economics department at the University of California, Los Angeles. He has also held positions at the University of Pennsylvania, the European University Institute and the University of Toronto. He is a Fellow of the Econometric Society, Research Associate of the National Bureau of Economic Research, and Research Fellow of the Centre for Economic Policy Research, and the former Research Director of the National Institute of Economic and Social Research (NIESR). In 2013, he was the Senior Houblon-Norman Fellow at the Bank of England. He is internationally recognized for his work on self-fulfilling prophecies. Farmer has published several scholarly articles in leading academic journals. He is also a co-founder of the Indeterminacy School in Macroeconomics. His body of work has advanced the view that beliefs are a new fundamental in economics that have the same methodological status as preferences, technology, and endowments. In his 1993 book, Macroeconomics of Self-fulfilling Prophecies, he argues that beliefs should be modeled with the introduction of a Belief Function, which explains how people form ideas about the future based on things they have seen in the past. In his 2010 book, Expectations, Employment and Prices, he suggests an alternative paradigm to New Keynesian economics which reintroduces a central idea from John Maynard Keynes' The General Theory of Employment, Interest and Money; that high involuntary unemployment can persist as a permanent equilibrium outcome. He provided an accessible introduction to these ideas in his 2010 book How the Economy Works, and more recently, in his 2016 book Prosperity for All, both of which were written for a general audience. The Farmer Monetary Model has different and high policy implications and relevance. Farmer's policy proposal to achieve full employment by controlling and stabilizing asset prices shows promise as a way to help prevent stock market crashes and deep recessions. His son is the economist Leland Edward Farmer, who joined the faculty at the University of Virginia in July 2017.

Awards and honors
 Honorary Fellow, National Institute of Economic and Social Research (NIESR) 2019–present
 Research Director, National Institute of Economic and Social Research (NIESR) UK, November 2016–September 2019
 Festschrift in Honour of Professor Roger Farmer
 Co-Winner of the 2013 Maurice Allais Prize in Economic Science
 Houblon-Norman Senior Fellowship, Bank of England, January–December 2013
 Research Associate, National Bureau of Economic Research
 Research Fellow, Centre for Economic Policy Research
 Warren C. Scoville Distinguished Teaching Award, UCLA
 Fellow, Econometrics Society, 2003 –Present
 University of Helsinki Medal, 2000(In Recognition of Work on Self-Fulfilling Prophecies)
 Fellow Commoner, Churchill College Cambridge
 National Science Foundation Grants, 1988-1990, 1996-1999, 2004–2007, 2007-2010
 Cobden Prize, Manchester University, 1976

Education
 Ph.D. Economics, University of Western Ontario, London, Ontario, Canada, 1982
 M.A. Econometrics, Manchester University, Manchester, UK, 1977
 B.A. Economics, First Class Honors, Manchester University, Manchester UK, 1976
 Latymer Grammar School, London, UK, 1973

References

External links

 Roger Farmer's Economic Window

1955 births
Living people
21st-century American economists
University of Western Ontario alumni
University of California, Los Angeles faculty
Fellows of the Econometric Society